John "Mr. Magic" Rivas, (March 15, 1956 – October 2, 2009) was a prominent hip hop radio DJ.

Career
Mr. Magic debuted in 1979 on WHBI in New York City with “Disco Showcase” on the pay-for-time FM station. It was a far cry from the prime time in New York; what he didn’t realize was he was starting the very first rap radio show. A few short years would go by and Frankie Crocker, program manager for Inner City Broadcasting, took his rising star to commercial powerhouse WBLS with the first exclusive rap radio show to be aired on a major station.
Rap Attack, Magic's show featured Marley Marl as the DJ and Tyrone "Fly Ty" Williams as the show's co-producer. Magic moved full-time to WBLS in July 1982. His reign on the New York City airwaves lasted six years and was instrumental in broadening the scope and validity of hip-hop music. Mr. Magic recorded one 12" single as an artist "Magic's Message (There's A Better Way)", produced by Spyder D for Posse Records in 1984. He is also interviewed in the 1986 cult documentary Big Fun In The Big Town.

During the mid-80s there was a rivalry between Mr. Magic and Kool DJ Red Alert, who hosted a weekly show on WRKS-FM. The feud also played out between proxy rap groups, the Juice Crew and Boogie Down Productions (see The Bridge Wars). The Juice Crew – headed by Mr. Magic's on-air assistant, DJ Marley Marl – was named after one of Magic's aliases, "Sir Juice."

In 2002 Magic lent his voice to Grand Theft Auto: Vice City, as himself, a DJ on one of the in-game radio stations.

Magic passed away on October 2, 2009 at the age of 53 due to a heart attack.

References

External links
Excerpt about Mr. Magic from "The Big Payback: The History of the Business of Hip-Hop," (New American Library/Penguin, 2010
[ Biography on Allmusic]
Vice City biography on IGN

1956 births
2009 deaths
American hip hop DJs
People from the Bronx
History of hip hop
Profile Records artists
Juice Crew members